Jamie Kaler (born September 14, 1964) is an American stand-up comedian and actor who has gained fame by portraying the character Mike Callahan on the TBS comedy My Boys.

Career
Kaler hosted America: Facts vs. Fiction on American Heroes Channel. He has appeared on such talk shows as the Late Late Show as well as having a role on the sitcom How I Met Your Mother, and had a recurring role on Will and Grace. Kaler has also done voice work for Robot Chicken.  He is a member of the ACME Company, ACME Comedy Theatre's top-level sketch company and has also made guest appearances on Friends, The King of Queens, Shake It Up and Monk.

Personal life
Kaler graduated from Boston University, and was afterwards commissioned as a lieutenant in the United States Navy and stationed in San Diego. After resigning his commission, he started performing in comedy clubs and eventually became involved in the Los Angeles comedy scene.

Filmography

References

External links

Official site

American male television actors
Boston University alumni
1964 births
Living people
American stand-up comedians
Place of birth missing (living people)
People from Hooksett, New Hampshire
Male actors from New Hampshire
21st-century American male actors
American male film actors
20th-century American male actors
20th-century American comedians
21st-century American comedians